The Legitimacy Act 1926 was an Act of the Parliament of the United Kingdom. The purpose of the Legitimacy Act 1926 was to amend the law relating to children born out of wedlock.

Act
The fundamental principle of the Legitimacy Act 1926 is exposed in article 1(2):  
"Nothing in this Act shall operate to legitimate a person whose father or mother was married to a third person when the illegitimate person was born."
The Act allowed children to be legitimised by the subsequent marriage of their parents, provided that neither parent had been married to a third party at the time of the birth. In those circumstances, the legitimised birth was re-entered in the birth indexes for that year (sometimes many years after the original birth). The original entry would be annotated to refer to the new entry.

The act was modified by the Legitimacy Act 1959, which extended it to children whose parent(s) had been married to somebody else when they were born.

References 

United Kingdom Acts of Parliament 1926
Repealed United Kingdom Acts of Parliament
Legitimacy law
Family law in the United Kingdom